Luca Colombo (born 8 November 1984 in Sondrio) is an Italian retired football player who played as a centre-back.

Football career
Colombo started his career at Olginatese. In summer 2003, he was on loan to Internazionale youth team (under-20). Inter bought him a year later, but sold to Sora (Serie C1) in join-ownership bid. He played his only fully professional match on 13 March 2005 against Vis Pesaro.

In summer 2005, Sora got full ownership but he left for Oggiono of Serie D.

On 30 August 2006, Colombo transferred to FC Chiasso of Swiss Challenge League. He played 23 matches and scored 4 goals in 2007–08 season.

Since summer 2009 he played for Serie D team A.S.D. Sanluri Calcio, and since summer 2010 he played for Serie D team Fiorenzuola.

Coaching career
After retiring in the summer 2017, Sora became the manager of Sondrio.

On 13 December 2018, Sora was appointed as the manager of Stresa Sportiva in the Italian Serie D. He was fired on 26 February 2019.

References

Italian footballers
Italian expatriate footballers
Inter Milan players
FC Chiasso players
Association football central defenders
Expatriate footballers in Switzerland
Italian expatriate sportspeople in Switzerland
Sportspeople from the Province of Sondrio
1984 births
Living people
U.S.D. Olginatese players
Footballers from Lombardy